Ramatuelle (Provençal: Ramatuela) is a commune in the Var department of the Provence-Alpes-Côte d'Azur region in Southeastern France. In 2016, it had a population of 2,077.

History
Ramatuelle lies near St-Tropez, Sainte-Maxime and Gassin. It was built on a hill to defend itself against enemies. The town was known in the Middle Ages as Ramatuella (derived from the Arabic Rahmatollah i.e.  رحمة الله  'the mercy of God') and was part of the area ruled by the Moors of nearby Fraxinet in the ninth and tenth centuries.

Geography

Climate

Ramatuelle has a hot-summer Mediterranean climate (Köppen climate classification Csa).

See also
Communes of the Var department
Umayyad invasion of Gaul

References

External links
 Tourism Office

Communes of Var (department)